Love and Luck is a fictional queer love story set in Melbourne, Australia. The show is hosted by Erin Kyan and produced by Passer Vulpes Productions.

Background 
The show is produced by Lee Davis-Thalbourne and Erin Kyan who describes themself as a "fat, queer, disabled, trans man". The show follows the fictional relationship of Jason and Kane through their voicemail. As the story progresses the two characters learn that they have magical abilities. The first season contained forty-eight episodes. The show stopped producing episodes during the COVID-19 pandemic,  but later produced an episode about the characters experiences with the isolation imposed by the pandemic.

Cast and characters 
Erin Kyan as Jason Flint
Lee Davis-Thalbourne as Kane Baxter
Nicola Rummery as Julie Baxter
DL Turnbull as Victor
Ashe Connor as Helen
Justin Jones Li as Ricardo
Tahlia Celenn as Mira
Creatrix Tiara as Storm
Oscar Sabogal as Michael
Jai Moore as CJ/Cindy
Abigail Michell as Eileen
Shelley Dunlop as Maggie
Ben Harberts as News Anchor
Gemma Mahadeo as Priya Singh

Reception 
The show was one of the Emerging Writers' Festival recommendations. Peter Wells wrote in the Sydney Morning Herald that "Love and Luck is a breath of fresh air". The show was a finalist in the Australian Podcast Awards for "Best Fiction Podcast".

References

External links 
 

Australian podcasts
LGBT-related podcasts
Transgender-related mass media
2017 podcast debuts
Audio podcasts
Scripted podcasts